The third season of the television series True Blood premiered on June 13, 2010 simultaneously on HBO and HBO Canada. It concluded its run on September 12, 2010 and contained 12 episodes, bringing the series total to 36. It loosely follows the plot of the third novel of The Southern Vampire Mysteries series, Club Dead.

Plot
The third season loosely follows the plot of the novel Club Dead, which finds Sookie teaming up with a werewolf sent by Eric, named Alcide in Mississippi in order to track down Bill, who has been kidnapped and is being held hostage by a vampire King. Season three is set throughout the course of 10 days.

Episodes

Cast and characters

Main cast

 Anna Paquin as Sookie Stackhouse
 Stephen Moyer as Bill Compton
 Sam Trammell as Sam Merlotte
 Ryan Kwanten as Jason Stackhouse
 Rutina Wesley as Tara Thornton
 Kevin Alejandro as Jesus Velasquez
 Marshall Allman as Tommy Mickens
 Chris Bauer as Andy Bellefleur
 Kristin Bauer van Straten as Pamela Swynford De Beaufort
 Nelsan Ellis as Lafayette Reynolds
 Mariana Klaveno as Lorena Krasiki
 Todd Lowe as Terry Bellefleur
 Denis O'Hare as Russell Edgington
 Jim Parrack as Hoyt Fortenberry
 Carrie Preston as Arlene Fowler
 Lindsay Pulsipher as Crystal Norris
 William Sanderson as Sheriff Bud Dearborne
 Alexander Skarsgård as Eric Northman
 Deborah Ann Woll as Jessica Hamby

Special guest cast

 Evan Rachel Wood as Sophie-Anne Leclerq
 Adina Porter as Lettie Mae Thornton
 Alfre Woodard as Ruby Jean Reynolds
 Tiffany Taylor as Nan's girl

Guest cast

 Theo Alexander as Talbot
 Grant Bowler as Coot
 James Frain as Franklin Mott
 Joe Manganiello as Alcide Herveaux
 J. Smith-Cameron as Melinda Mickens
 Melissa Rauch as Summer
 Gregory Sporleder as Calvin Norris
 Don Swayze as Gus
 Tanya Wright as Deputy Kenya Jones
 Natasha Alam as Yvetta
 James Harvey Ward as Felton Norris
 Cooper Huckabee as Joe Lee Mickens
 Brit Morgan as Debbie Pelt
 Lauren Bowles as Holly Cleary
 Jessica Tuck as Nan Flanagan
 Tara Buck as Ginger
 Grey Damon as Kitch Maynard
 Lindsey Haun as Hadley Hale
 Željko Ivanek as Magnus the Magister
 Lara Pulver as Claudine
 John Rezig as Deputy Kevin Ellis
 Carlson Young as Tammy
 Bryan Becker as Louie
 Ronnie Gene Blevins as T-Dub
 John Burke as Jerry McCafferty
 Greg Cipes as Bufort Norris
 Gregg Daniel as Reverend Daniels
 Kevin Fry Bowers as Turk
 John Hillard as Hank
 Allan Hyde as Godric
 Kate Lyuben as Natalie
 Andy Mackenzie as Creepy Biker
 Dakin Matthews as Dr. Robideaux
 Michael McMillian as Reverend Steve Newlin
 Tess Alexandra Parker as Rosie
 Dale Raoul as Maxine Fortenberry
 Michael Raymond-James as Rene Lenier
 Jeanne Baron as Hostess
 John Billingsley as Mike Spencer
 Sean Bridgers as Big Bobby
 Arielle Kebbel as Charlene
 Daniel Gillies as Jon
 John Prosky as David Finch
 Stewart Skelton as Minister
 Michael Steger as Tony
 Jorge Diaz as Husband

Production
On January 20, 2010 HBO released a teaser trailer announcing that a third season of True Blood was in production, aiming for a Summer 2010 release date. The teaser featured images of bottles of TruBlood being manufactured on an assembly line. This was followed by a trailer featuring new footage and the song The Difference Between Us by The Dead Weather. This was released by HBO on May 13.

Crew
Alan Ball returned to executive produce and run season three. Michael Lehmann, who had directed five episodes at the end of the second season, is expected to return again to direct three more. Writers Alexander Woo and Raelle Tucker also returned to script episodes.

Casting
Anna Paquin, Stephen Moyer, Sam Trammell, Ryan Kwanten, Rutina Wesley, Chris Bauer, Nelsan Ellis, Mariana Klaveno, Todd Lowe, Jim Parrack, Carrie Preston, William Sanderson, Deborah Ann Woll and Alexander Skarsgård all reprise their respective roles in the third season. Additionally, Kristin Bauer, who plays vampire Pam in the series, is promoted to series regular. 

After a long search, it was announced that Joe Manganiello was cast as werewolf Alcide Herveaux. He was later joined by Brit Morgan as Debbie Pelt. Marshall Allman is added to the third season as a series regular, cast as Sam Merlotte's younger brother Tommy Mickens and Cooper Huckabee plays Sam Merlotte's long-lost father. Alfre Woodard was cast as Lafayette's mother and Southland actor Kevin Alejandro as Jesus, her caretaker and a potential love interest for Lafayette. Denis O'Hare plays Russell Edgington, the Vampire King of Mississippi, while New Zealand actor Grant Bowler plays the leader of a werewolf biker gang and Theo Alexander plays the role of Edgington's partner Talbot. Allan Hyde has confirmed he will reprise his role as Godric in the form of flashbacks. James Frain appears as Franklin Mott.

Awards & Nominations

The series won the GLADD Award for Best Drama Series, Alfre Woodard received a nomination for Best Guest Star in a Drama Series and the show received the "Holy Shit Scene of the Year" award at the Scream Awards for the scene in which Bill twisted Lorena's neck 180 degrees whilst the two were having sex.

Ratings

United States

United Kingdom 
United Kingdom ratings data is taken from the Broadcasters' Audience Research Board.

See also
 Longwood (Natchez, Mississippi)

References

External links 
 

True Blood
2010 American television seasons